Khatas (Xatas) is a rural locality (a selo), the administrative centre of and one of four settlements, in addition to Voin, Taragay-Byas and Yuner-Olokh, in Khomustakhsky 2-y Rural Okrug of Namsky District in the Sakha Republic, Russia. Its population as of the 2002 Census was 637.

References

Notes

Sources
Official website of the Sakha Republic. Registry of the Administrative-Territorial Divisions of the Sakha Republic. Namsky District. 

Rural localities in Namsky District
Populated places on the Lena River